Big Radio 1 or Big Radio - Prvi program is a Bosnian local commercial radio station, broadcasting from Banja Luka, Bosnia and Herzegovina. This radio station broadcasts a variety of programs such as Rock, Pop & Evergreen music and local news. The owner of the radio station is the company BIG RADIO d.o.o. Banja Luka.

Program is mainly produced in Serbian at one FM frequency (Banja Luka ) and it is available in the city of Banja Luka as well as in nearby municipalities Laktaši, Čelinac, Prijedor, Bosanska Gradiška/Gradiška and Kotor Varoš.

Under this name, Big Radio 1 was launched on 21 March 1992 as one of the first private local radio stations in Bosnia and Herzegovina.

Estimated number of listeners of Big Radio 1 is around 290.524.

Big Radio
Big Radio operates three local FM radio stations (Big Radio 1, Big Radio 3, Big Radio 4), one near-national FM radio station in Bosnia and Herzegovina (Big Radio 2), three online internet radio services (Big Folk Radio, Big Balade Radio, Big Rock Radio) as well as two web portals www.bigportal.ba and www.bigradiobl.com.

Frequencies
 Banja Luka

See also 
 List of radio stations in Bosnia and Herzegovina
 Big Radio
 Radio A
 Nes Radio
 RSG Radio

References

External links 
 www.bigradiobl.com
 www.bigportal.ba
 www.radiostanica.ba
 www.fmscan.org
 Communications Regulatory Agency of Bosnia and Herzegovina

Banja Luka
Radio stations established in 1992
Mass media in Banja Luka